Wambaya is a Non-Pama-Nyungan West Barkly Australian language of the Mirndi language group that is spoken in the  Barkly Tableland of the Northern Territory, Australia. Wambaya and the other members of the West Barkly languages are somewhat unusual in that they are suffixing languages, unlike most Non-Pama-Nyungan languages which are prefixing.

The language was reported to have 12 speakers in 1981, and some reports indicate that the language went extinct as a first language. However, in the 2011 Australian census 56 people stated that they speak Wambaya at home. That number increased to 61 in the 2016 Census.

Rachel Nordlinger notes that the speech of the Wambaya, Gudanji and Binbinka people "are clearly dialects" of a single language, which she calls "McArthur", while Ngarnga is closely related but is "probably best considered a language of its own".

Phonology

Consonants 

 Sounds /ɡ, ŋ/ are heard as palatalized [ɡʲ, ŋʲ] when before front vowels.
 /ɾ/ is heard as a trill [r] when in pre-consonantal position.

Vowels 

 /a/ can be heard as [æ] when after palatal sounds /ɟ, ɲ/ and before /j/.
 /ɪ/ is heard as [i] when before /j/.

References

External links 
 Bibliography of Binbinga people and language resources, at the Australian Institute of Aboriginal and Torres Strait Islander Studies
 Bibliography of Gudanji people and language resources, at the Australian Institute of Aboriginal and Torres Strait Islander Studies

Ngurlun languages
Endangered indigenous Australian languages in the Northern Territory